Lamnoidea is a proposed superfamily of mackerel sharks that includes the families Lamnidae and Otodontidae. A sister group relationship between lamnids and otodontids is supported by synapomorphies including regional endothermy, tooth morphology, and rostral cartilage morphology.

Phylogeny
Below is a cladogram showing the position of Lamnoidea within Lamniformes. The topology of extant families is based on Vella & Vella (2020) and the placements of Cretoxyrhinidae and Otodontidae are based on Ferrón (2017), Cooper (2020), and Greenfield (2022).

References

 
Animal superfamilies